Barbosa may refer to:

People
 Barbosa (surname)

Places
Barbosa, Antioquia, Colombian municipality
Barbosa, Santander, Colombian municipality
Barbosa, São Paulo, Brazilian municipality
Carlos Barbosa, Brazilian city

Other
Barbosa (genus), a plant genus

See also
 Barboza
 Barbarossa (disambiguation)